Julius Berger may refer to:

Julius Berger (company), a Nigerian construction and real estate developer based in Abuja, FCT
Julius Berger (cellist)
Julius Victor Berger (1850–1902), Austrian painter
Julius Berger FC, a football club of Julius Berger Nigeria PLC
Julius Berger Tiefbau AG, a European company specialized in civil and industrial construction, engineering and services 
Julius Berger, a character in Outcasts

See also
Julius Bürger (1897–1995), Austrian-born American composer and conductor

Berger, Julius